Woldegk is an Amt in the Mecklenburgische Seenplatte district, in Mecklenburg-Vorpommern, Germany. The seat of the Amt is in Woldegk.

The Amt Woldegk consists of the following municipalities:
 Groß Miltzow
 Kublank
 Neetzka
 Schönbeck
 Schönhausen
 Voigtsdorf
 Woldegk

Ämter in Mecklenburg-Western Pomerania
Mecklenburgische Seenplatte (district)